Hydrangea robusta is a species of flowering plant in the family Hydrangeaceae, native to China and the Himalayas.

References

External links
 Hydrangea robusta at efloras.org.

robusta
Flora of China
Taxa named by Joseph Dalton Hooker
Taxa named by Thomas Thomson (botanist)